Jandré Marais (born 14 June 1989) is a South African rugby union footballer. His regular playing position is lock. He represents Bordeaux Bègles in the French Top 14, having previously played for the Sharks in Super Rugby and the Currie Cup.

In December 2018, Marais was sidelined for the remainder of the 2018–19 season with a serious leg injury, after rupturing his cruciate ligament during a match.

References

External links

itsrugby.co.uk Profile
Sharks Profile

1989 births
Living people
Afrikaner people
Rugby union locks
Rugby union players from Welkom
Sharks (Currie Cup) players
Sharks (rugby union) players
South Africa Under-20 international rugby union players
South African rugby union players